The 2004 Miami RedHawks football team represented the Miami University in the 2004 NCAA Division I-A football season. They played their home games at Yager Stadium in Oxford, Ohio and competed as members of the Mid-American Conference. The team was coached by head coach Terry Hoeppner, who resigned after the season to become the head coach at Indiana.

Schedule

References

Miami
Miami RedHawks football seasons
Miami RedHawks football